Rio Antonio Zoba Mavuba (born 8 March 1984) is a French former professional footballer who played as a midfielder. He works as assistant manager at Bordeaux II.

He spent most of his professional career with Bordeaux and Lille, winning the 2011 national championship with the latter.

A France international since 2004, Mavuba represented the country at the 2014 World Cup.

Early years
Mavuba's father was Mavuba Mafuila, a footballer who appeared at the 1974 FIFA World Cup with Zaire, while his mother was an Angolan national. He was born on board a boat in international waters during the period of the Angolan Civil War, and later stated that his birth certificate did not have a nationality on it, reading only "born at sea"; he received French nationality in September 2004.

Mavuba's mother died when he was two, and his father when he was 12 years old. He launched himself into football to help deal with his grief.

Club career

Bordeaux
Mavuba played youth football with Bordeaux. He made his Ligue 1 debut on 10 January 2004 in a 2–1 away win against Montpellier and, under recently appointed manager Michel Pavon, became an immediate first-choice.

From the 2004–05 season until the end of his spell, Mavuba never appeared in less than 32 league matches.

Villarreal and Lille

On 3 July 2007, Mavuba signed a five-year contract with Villarreal worth €7 million, as the Spanish side had lost Alessio Tacchinardi who returned to Juventus following a loan. He found it hard to break into the first team, only totalling 219 minutes in La Liga, and in late January 2008 joined Lille on loan until the end of the season.

The transfer was made subsequently permanent in summer 2008, with the player penning a four-year contract for a reported fee of €7 million. He appeared in 46 matches between the league and the Coupe de France in his third year, helping Les Dogues win both competitions, the former after a 57-year wait.

Mavuba suffered a knee injury midway through the 2012–13 season, being sidelined for more than three months. On 22 December 2013, the team captain scored his first goal of the new campaign, helping to a 2–2 draw at Paris Saint-Germain and being involved in a scuffle with Zlatan Ibrahimović, with both players being booked late into the first half.

On 26 May 2015, Mavuba signed a new four-year deal with Lille.

Later career
On 21 July 2017, 33-year-old Mavuba agreed to a three-year contract with Czech club Sparta Prague. He returned to his adopted homeland on 14 September 2018, signing with Championnat National 3 amateurs .

Mavuba was appointed manager of his last team in April 2019. In October 2020, he became assistant coach at Bordeaux's reserves.

International career
In 2004, Mavuba was asked to play for the DR Congo national team, but he turned it down. From the 2004 Toulon Tournament to the 2006 UEFA European Championship, he acted as captain to the French under-21s.

Mavuba won his first cap for the senior side on 18 August 2004, in a 1–1 friendly draw with Bosnia and Herzegovina in Rennes. From 2008 to 2011, he did not make one single appearance.

Mavuba was selected by coach Didier Deschamps for his 2014 FIFA World Cup squad. He made his debut in the competition on 15 June, coming on as a second-half substitute for Yohan Cabaye in a 3–0 group stage win against Honduras.

Honours
Bordeaux
Coupe de la Ligue: 2006–07

Lille
Ligue 1: 2010–11
Coupe de France: 2010–11

References

External links

1984 births
Living people
People born at sea
French people of Angolan descent
Black French sportspeople
French sportspeople of Democratic Republic of the Congo descent
French sportspeople of Republic of the Congo descent
French footballers
Association football midfielders
Ligue 1 players
Championnat National 3 players
FC Girondins de Bordeaux players
Lille OSC players
La Liga players
Villarreal CF players
Czech First League players
AC Sparta Prague players
France under-21 international footballers
France international footballers
2014 FIFA World Cup players
French expatriate footballers
Expatriate footballers in Spain
Expatriate footballers in the Czech Republic
French expatriate sportspeople in Spain
French expatriate sportspeople in the Czech Republic